Perception is the fourth studio album by the American alternative rock band Blessid Union of Souls, released in 2005 on Ultrax Records.

Track listing
 "Could've Been with You" — 3:49
 "Wild Side of Me" — 4:03
 "I Still Believe in Love" — 4:46
 "Bittersweet Sublime" — 3:57
 "A Thousand and One" — 4:06
 "Closer" — 3:50
 "I Have Just Begun to Live" — 4:12
 "Let's Get Out of Here" — 4:30
 "How Does It Feel Coming Down" — 4:09
 "Say Hello to My Little Friend" — 4:07
 "Reminds Me of You" — 4:04
 "She's the One" — 4:31
 "Better Side of Me" — 3:31
 "Give Her What She Wants" — 4:23
 "Redemption" — 4:14
 "I Was Never Here" — 7:35

External links
Album review at CDBaby
Album information at Amazon

2005 albums
Blessid Union of Souls albums